Singles is a greatest hits album by American pop rock band Maroon 5. It was released on September 25, 2015, through 222 and Interscope Records. The album includes 12 of the band's greatest hit singles released from their first five studio albums: Songs About Jane (2002), It Won't Be Soon Before Long (2007), Hands All Over (2010), Overexposed (2012), and V (2014).

Singles was released during the Maroon V Tour in Asia. The album does not contain any new or unreleased songs.

Background
On September 1, 2015, Interscope Records announced that Maroon 5 would be releasing their debut greatest hits album, on their label. The track listing and album art cover were announced on the same day, revealing that there will be only 12 singles featured on the compilation album and will not withhold any new or unreleased tracks. Fans have also responded to the lack of more favorable hits on the album, such as "Harder to Breathe", "Sunday Morning" and "Won't Go Home Without You", though the latter two are included on the Japanese edition of the album.

Album artwork
The album artwork for Singles was shot and edited by photographer and tourist Travis Schneider, also known as bootswallace on various social media websites, which was confirmed by Schneider via Twitter on September 6, 2015. The photo was taken whilst on tour with Maroon 5 on their North American leg of their world tour backstage.

Critical reception
Writing for Contactmusic.com, Alex Lai stated: "For anyone who has forgotten or indeed not been familiar with the work of Adam Levine and company, this is a fine demonstration of their ability to blend genres".

Commercial performance
The album debuted at number six in Japan, selling 11,000 physical copies in its first week. In Brazil, the album debuted at number eight on the ABPD chart, selling 20,000 copies in its first week.

Track listing

Notes
  signifies an additional producer

Personnel
 Adam Levine – lead vocals, lead and rhythm guitar, songwriter, band member
 Jesse Carmichael – keyboards, backing vocals, rhythm guitar, songwriter, band member
 Mickey Madden – bass guitar, songwriter, band member
 James Valentine – lead guitar, backing vocals, songwriter, band member
 Matt Flynn – drums, percussion, band member
 PJ Morton – keyboards, backing vocals, band member
 Ryan Dusick – drums, percussion (on tracks 1 and 3), band member (former)
 Sam Farrar – production, keyboards, programming, songwriter, band touring member
 Christina Aguilera – guest vocals (on track 5)
 Wiz Khalifa – guest vocals (on track 2)

Charts

Weekly charts

Year-end charts

Certifications and sales

Release history

References

2015 greatest hits albums
Maroon 5 compilation albums
222 Records albums
Interscope Records compilation albums
Universal Music Group compilation albums